Josh Kotelnicki is a former American football coach. He served as the head football coach at the University of Mary in Bismarck, North Dakota from 2014 to 2017, compiling a record of 8–36. Kotelnicki was fired after three consecutive 1–10 seasons and replaced by Craig Bagnell. A native of Litchfield, Minnesota,  Kotelnicki played college football at the University of North Dakota, where he was a starting outside linebacker on the 2001 North Dakota Fighting Sioux football team, which won the NCAA Division II Football Championship.

Head coaching record

References

External links
 North Dakota profile

Year of birth missing (living people)
Living people
American football outside linebackers
North Dakota Fighting Hawks football players
Kansas State Wildcats football coaches
Mary Marauders football coaches
Murray State Racers football coaches
North Dakota Fighting Hawks football coaches
Truman Bulldogs football coaches
People from Litchfield, Minnesota
Players of American football from Minnesota